Vicenzino is a surname. Notable people with the surname include:

Bill Vicenzino, Australian academic
Tania Vicenzino (born 1986), Italian long jumper and bobsledder